Carl Morten Amundsen (born 11 January 1961 in Bergen) is a Norwegian dramaturg and theatre director.

He was dramaturg for Nationaltheatret from 1993 to 2000, and was theatre director at Teatret Vårt in Molde from 2000 to 2011. He has been manager for Norsk Teaterlederforum from 2003. He has also worked for the Carrousel Theater an der Parkaue in Berlin.

References

1961 births
Living people
Norwegian theatre directors